For a list of companies based within Dallas city limits, go to List of companies in Dallas

The Dallas/Fort Worth Metroplex is home to over 20 corporate headquarters, making the Dallas/Fort Worth Metroplex one of the largest corporate headquarters concentration in the United States. This also has resulted in the growth of Dallas/Fort Worth International Airport, home to American Airlines, the second largest airline in the world, Largest in the U.S. and the rapid population growth of the metropolitan area, the fourth largest in the United States. In recent years, the Dallas–Fort Worth metroplex has also attracted many other large companies such as Toyota, State Farm, JPMorgan Chase and Core-Mark. In 2019, Charles Schwab announced it would be relocating its San Francisco headquarters to Westlake, a suburb of Fort Worth.

Uber, based in San Francisco, will create a regional hub and hire 3,000 employees by the end of 2022 in Dallas.

The following companies are a selection of notable companies based in the metropolitan area.

Fortune 500 companies

The following are the Fortune 500 companies headquartered in the Dallas–Fort Worth metroplex:
6 ExxonMobil (Irving)
9 McKesson (Irving) 
13 AT&T (Dallas)
54 Energy Transfer Partners (Dallas)
114 American Airlines Group (Fort Worth)
124 DR Horton (Arlington)
126 CBRE Group (Dallas)
176 Builders Firstsource (Dallas)
181 Tenet Healthcare (Dallas)
182 Kimberly-Clark (Irving)
188 Charles Schwab Corporation (Westlake)
197 HF Sinclair (Dallas)
198 Texas Instruments (Dallas)
234 Southwest Airlines (Dallas)
248 Pioneer Natural Resources (Irving)
259 Fluor Corporation (Irving)
260 AECOM (Dallas)
262 Jacobs Engineering (Dallas)
315 Vistra Energy (Irving)
406 Celanese (Irving)
484 Commercial Metals (Irving)
485 EnLink Midstream (Dallas)

Other notable companies based in the Dallas–Fort Worth area
 7-Eleven (Irving)
 Alon USA (Dallas)
 Alcon (Fort Worth)
 At Home (Plano)
 The Beck Group (Dallas)
 Ben E. Keith Company (Fort Worth)
 Black-eyed Pea (Arlington)
 BNSF (Fort Worth)
 Borden Milk Products (Dallas)
 Boston Pizza Restaurants (Dallas)
 Briggs Equipment (Dallas)
 Brinker International (Dallas)
 Capital One (Plano)
 Cash America International (Fort Worth)
 Chief Oil & Gas (Dallas)
 Chili's (Dallas)
 Christus Health (Irving)
 Cicis (Irving)
 Cinemark (Plano)
 Citibank (Irving)
 Comerica (Dallas)
 Continental Electronics (Dallas)
 Copart (Dallas) 
 Corner Bakery Cafe (Dallas)
 Chuck E. Cheese (Irving)
 Crossmark (Plano)
 Dal-Tile Corporation (Dallas)
 Dave & Buster's  (Dallas)
 Dickey's Barbecue Pit (Dallas)
 DXC Technology (Plano)
 Ericsson (Plano)
 Essilor of America (Dallas)
 Fairmount Food Group (Dallas)
 FedEx Office (Plano)
 FFE Transportation (Dallas)
 Fisher Investments (Plano)
 Flowserve (Irving)
 Fossil Group (Richardson)
 Frito-Lay (Plano)
 Funimation (Flower Mound)
 Galderma (Fort Worth)
 GAINSCO (Dallas)
 GameStop (Grapevine) 
 Gap Broadcasting Group (Dallas)
 Gartner, Inc. (Irving)
 GE Capital (Arlington)
 GM Financial (Fort Worth)
 Goldman Sachs (Dallas)
 Greyhound Lines (Dallas)
 Gutterth (Denton)
 Haggar Clothing (Dallas)
 Half Price Books (Dallas)
 Hall of Fame Racing (Dallas)
 HBK Investments (Dallas)
 Hoak Media Corporation (Dallas)
 id Software (Dallas)
 InfoCom Corporation (Dallas)
 Interstate Batteries (Dallas)
 Intuit (Plano)
 KidZania (USA headquarters) (Plano)
 Knockouts (Irving)
 Jamba Juice (Frisco)
 JPMorgan Chase (Plano)
 La Madeleine (Dallas)
 La Quinta Inns & Suites (Irving)
 Lennox International (Richardson)
 Liberty Mutual Insurance (Plano)
 Lockheed Martin (Fort Worth)
 Mary Kay (Addison)
 Match.com (Dallas)
 Matrix Business Technologies (Dallas)
 Merit Energy (Dallas)
 Metro by T-Mobile (Richardson)
 The Michaels Companies (Irving)
 Microsoft (Irving)
 Mohr Partners (Dallas)
 MoneyGram (Dallas)
 Monitronics (Farmers Branch)
 MumboJumbo (Dallas)
 NCH Corporation (Irving)
 Neiman Marcus (Dallas)
 NEC Corporation of America (Irving)
 Nexstar Media Group (Irving)
 Niagara Conservation Corporation (Fort Worth)
 Nokia (North American Headquarters) (Dallas)
 NTT Data (Plano)
 The Odee Company (Dallas)
 TPG Sixth Street Partners
 Peterbilt (Denton)
 PlainsCapital Corporation (Dallas)
 Pizza Hut (Plano)
 Pioneer Corporation (Fort Worth)
 Primoris Services Corporation (Dallas)
 Red Mango (Dallas)
 Reddy Ice (Dallas)
 Rent-A-Center (Plano)
 Rolex (Dallas)
 Sabre Corporation (Southlake)
 Salesforce (Dallas)
 Sally Beauty Holdings (Denton)
 Sammons Enterprises (Dallas)
 ScrewAttack (Flower Mound)
 Six Flags (Grand Prairie)
 Skagen Denmark (Richardson)
 Smoothie King (Dallas)
 Solera Holdings (Westlake)
 State Farm Insurance (Richardson)
 TD Ameritrade (Westlake)
 Think Finance (Dallas)
 Titanium Metals (Dallas)
 Topgolf (Dallas)
 Torchmark Corporation (Headquarters) (McKinney)
 Toyota Motor North America (Headquarters) (Plano)
 Trinity Industries (Dallas)
 Tuesday Morning (Dallas)
 Tyler Technologies (Headquarters) (Plano)
 Uber Technologies (Dallas)
 United Surgical Partners International (Dallas)
 Verizon (Irving)
 Wingstop (Dallas)
 XTO Energy (Fort Worth)
 ZTE (USA headquarters) (Richardson)

References

Companies (Dallas Fort Worth)
 
 
Dallas